The Jewett Five-Passenger Coach was manufactured for the Jewett marque of the Paige-Detroit Motor Car Company of Detroit, Michigan.

Jewett Five-Passenger Coach specifications (1926 data) 

 Color – Gray, Jordan Blue, or Thistle Green
 Seating Capacity –Five
 Wheelbase – 125½ inches
 Wheels - Wood
 Tires - 32” × 6.20” balloon
 Service Brakes – Hydraulic, contracting on four wheels
 Emergency Brakes – Contracting on transmission
 Engine  - Eight cylinder in line, cast en block, 3 × 4¾ inches; head removable; valves in side; H.P. 28.8, N.A.C.C. rating
 Lubrication – Force feed and splash
 Crankshaft - Five bearing
 Radiator - Cellular
 Cooling – Water pump
 Ignition –Storage battery
 Starting System – Single Unit
 Voltage – Six to eight
 Wiring System – Single
 Gasoline System – Vacuum
 Clutch – Dry plate
 Transmission – Selective sliding
 Gear Changes – 3 forward, 1 reverse
 Drive – Spiral bevel
 Rear Springs – Semi-elliptic
 Rear Axle – Semi-floating
 Steering Gear – Worm and worm wheel

Standard equipment
New car price included the following items:
 tools
 jack
 speedometer
 ammeter
 motometer
 electric horn
 transmission theft lock
 automatic windshield cleaner
 demountable rims
 spare rim
 snubbers
 stop light
 inspection lamp and cord
 spare tire carrier
 rear view mirror
 cowl ventilator
 clock
 closed cars have smoking case, vanity cases and dome light, and trunk on Victoria and Brougham.

Optional equipment
The following was available at an extra cost:
 None

Prices
New car prices were available F.O.B. factory plus tax on the following models:
 Touring - $2575
 Playboy - $2575
 Victoria - $2775
 Brougham - $2875
 Friendly Three - $2875
 Five Passenger Sedan - $2975
 Seven Passenger Sedan - $3225
 Seven Passenger Suburban Sedan - $3375

See also
 Jewett (automobile)

References
Source: 

Cars of the United States

1920s cars